Banū ‘Abd ad-Dār ("Sons of the Servant of the House" — referring to the Kaaba) is a sub-clan of the Arabian Quraysh tribe.

History
Their progenitor is Abd-al-Dar ibn Qusai ibn Kilab. Historically, this tribe carried the banner in war, and Muhammad continued that tradition. In battles between the Makkans and the Muslims, the banner was frequently carried on both sides by a member of this tribe. Known to be the custodian of the Kaaba during the period of Jāhiliyyah ('Ignorance'), and upheld by the Islamic Nabí (Prophet) later on.

List
 The mistress of Al-Nahdiah
 Barrah bint Abdul Uzza bin Uthman bin Abd al-Dar, Muhammad's maternal grandmother
 Mus`ab ibn `Umair ibn Hashim ibn Abd Manaf ibn Abd al-Dar, a companion of Muhammad

See also
 Adnanite Arabs
 Hejaz

References

Abd-al-dar